The 1987 Paris Open was a Grand Prix men's tennis tournament played on indoor carpet courts. It was the 15th edition of the Paris Open (later known as the Paris Masters). It took place at the Palais omnisports de Paris-Bercy in Paris, France from 2 November through 9 November 1987.

Finals

Singles

 Tim Mayotte defeated  Brad Gilbert 2–6, 6–3, 7–5, 6–7, 6–3

Doubles

 Jakob Hlasek /  Claudio Mezzadri defeated  Scott Davis /  David Pate 7–6, 6–2

References

External links
 ATP tournament profile